Lag digl Obert or Lag Pign is a lake in the village of Laax, Grisons, Switzerland.

External links
 Lag digl Oberst at schweizersee.ch

Lakes of Switzerland
Lakes of Graubünden
LLaaxersee
Laax